The Legend of Zelda is a video game franchise created by Japanese video game designers Shigeru Miyamoto and Takashi Tezuka. It is mainly developed and published by Nintendo. The universe of the Legend of Zelda series consists of a variety of lands, the most predominant being . The franchise is set within a fantasy world that is reminiscent of medieval Europe and consists of several recurring locations, races and creatures. The most prominent population in the series are the Hylians, a humanoid race with elfin features, that are identifiable by their long, pointed ears. The game world is accompanied by a detailed fictional lore that contains a creation myth, several constructed languages, the most prominent being Hylian, and a fictional universal currency called the rupee. Most games in The Legend of Zelda series follow a similar storyline, which involves the protagonist Link battling monsters to save Princess Zelda and defeat an evil villain, which is often the series' main antagonist, Ganon. Nintendo developed the fictional lore into a complex timeline that spans across the series and chronicles thousands of years of fictional history.

Hyrule was created as the original setting for the 1986 The Legend of Zelda video game and has remained as the main fictional environment for successive games in the series. Inspired by dungeon crawlers, Miyamoto and Tezuka developed a high fantasy world in the form of a 2D map filled with monsters, puzzles and dungeons. Hyrule transitioned to a 3D environment with the development of the 1998 video game The Legend of Zelda: Ocarina of Time. For The Legend of Zelda: Breath of the Wild released in 2017, Nintendo developed Hyrule into a seamless open world. Since the launch of the original game, the series has been a commercial and critical success. It has introduced landmark innovations in world design that have since influenced numerous developers across the video game industry.

Overview 

The Legend of Zelda series is set in a fantasy world that first appeared in the original 1986 The Legend of Zelda video game, which was developed and published by Nintendo. The game introduced Hyrule as the predominant fictional world and the series protagonist named Link, a Hylian boy or young man who is the player character. The storyline of each game varies but follows a common overarching theme that involves Link travelling through Hyrule to rescue a magical princess named Princess Zelda and save the world from an evil antagonist, which is typically the series' main villain, Ganon. A recurring plot element in the games is Ganon's repeated attempts to obtain a mystical artifact named the Triforce to possess ultimate power. Although Link and Zelda have similar appearances in every game, they are different characters who reappear across thousands of years in the fictional timeline whenever evil threatens the world. The Legend of Zelda: Skyward Sword was established as the beginning of the fictional history and involves the antagonist Demise cursing the first incarnations of Link and Zelda so that their descendants forever appear in an endless cycle to protect Hyrule from evil.

Hyrule

Concept and design 

Japanese video game designer Shigeru Miyamoto conceived the land of Hyrule as the setting for the original 1986 video game The Legend of Zelda. He described Hyrule as "a miniature garden that you can put into a drawer and revisit anytime you like". He drew his inspiration from the Kyoto countryside that he had explored in his childhood and wanted to recreate the experience of adventure and discovery. Alongside writer Takashi Tezuka, Miyamoto created a fantasy world in the style of fantasy authors like Tolkien, which was viewed from a top-down perspective. It was populated with colourful characters, monsters and dungeons for the player to explore.

2D world design 
Miyamoto and Tezuka started working on The Legend of Zelda during the development of Super Mario Bros. Initially, the game did not feature an overworld. In Hyrule Historia, Miyamoto said that Nintendo aimed to develop a launch title for the Famicon Disk System. An early game was initially designed to make use of the Disk System's ability to rewrite data, allowing players to create dungeons and explore other players' creations. He explained: "We made a one-player game with dungeons under mountains that surrounded Death Mountain, but we couldn't shake that. "I want to play above ground, too!" feeling, so we added forests and lakes, and eventually Hyrule Field".

The first specifications were drawn up on a whiteboard by Miyamoto and then copied onto a document on 1 February 1985. The document detailed early concepts for items and enemies that would later feature in the game, such as a compass, bows and arrows and a boomerang, and "Hakkai" an early name given to Ganon. This was developed into rough sketches for various items and enemies within the following two weeks. The name for the game had not yet been decided, so the title was simply labelled "Adventure". Long paper was used to create the first land map of Hyrule, which was developed by Tezuka and Miyamoto sitting side by side and drawing together. Miyamoto said that the name "Hyrule" seemed like the perfect choice during a discussion to find a name for a high-fantasy region. In Japan, The Legend of Zelda game was released as The Hyrule Fantasy, which was almost chosen as the name for the entire franchise, but was dropped after the first game. Miyamoto said this could have been due to the name being too similar to Final Fantasy, which was released soon afterwards. 

The original Hyrule map was designed to encourage exploration and discovery, requiring up to several hours to navigate. The map is nonlinear, so players are free to choose from several unmarked paths, with just a few areas being inaccessible at the start. Miyamoto was influenced by The Black Onyx and Ultima, two games that centre around fantasy dungeon crawling. The Zelda world was defined by its mazes, hidden rooms and treasures. The game's nine dungeons were designed to be difficult to locate, forcing players to uncover the secrets of the map with little help. In addition to its underworld, the Hyrule map consists of a large overworld created out of a grid structure that is much larger than can be displayed on a single screen. It is 16 blocks wide and eight blocks high and comprises 128 areas. Miyamoto said that maps for the game were included in North America: "The maps included various hints, but to be honest, I thought it would be more enjoyable to play the game without any help. So we sealed the map, with a message reading 'You should only use the map and strategic tips as a last resort'". Players were required to begin their adventure in the centre of Hyrule and use instinct alone to find an old man inside a cave who gives Link a sword and declares, "It's dangerous to go alone!". While navigating Hyrule's overworld and its many dangerous enemies, players must eventually find the dungeons, which each feature various enemies, items and a boss.

The concept of a role-playing game was a new experience for players in the 1980s. The gameplay diverged from the fast-paced games typically found in arcades like Super Mario Bros, by offering players an open world to explore, puzzles to solve and a fantasy story that centres on a protagonist embarking on an adventure to save a princess from an evil villain and bring peace to Hyrule. The new game concept caused concern with Nintendo's management. In 2003, Miyamoto stated in an interview for Superplay magazine: "I remember that we were very nervous, because The Legend Of Zelda was our first game that forced the players to think about what they should do next. We were afraid that gamers would become bored and stressed by the new concept". During the testing phase, players complained about getting lost inside the game's dungeons, but rather than making the game more simplistic, Miyamoto decided to make it more challenging by removing Link's sword at the beginning of the game and forcing players to locate it. He wanted to encourage players to communicate with each other while solving the game's puzzles.

Transition to 3D 
Hyrule continued to evolve over the course of successive games. The transition from a 2D to 3D world occurred with the release of Ocarina of Time, due to the capabilities of the Nintendo 64, which gave players the opportunity to experience a more realistic game environment. The 3D world was also accompanied by an expanding fictional lore that laid the foundation for other games in the series within an official fictional timeline. The game's dungeons were each unique and connected to a specific area of Hyrule and its inhabitants. Several recurring races, such as the Gorons, Zora and Gerudo were introduced and given a distinct history and culture. Hyrule Field, an expansive open grassy area, was positioned at the centre of Hyrule, acting as a hub that connects other areas to create the illusion of a vast world. The game's time travel mechanic also introduced a dark version of Hyrule Kingdom, a land corrupted by Ganondorf's influence, with Hyrule Castle Town in ruins and Redead zombies as its inhabitants. 

Due to concerns about the limitations of the Nintendo 64, Miyamoto initially conceived the game taking place within a central hub in the confines of Ganon's Castle, similar to Peach's Castle in Super Mario 64. He described Ocarina of Time as a "huge project" due to the fact that it involved making the game environment from 3D polygons and was larger in scale than anything that he had previously worked on. He said that he had approached the game by first focusing on what types of characters he wanted to include, rather than on the story or the game functions. Ocarina of Time was designed with several innovations to help the player navigate the expansive 3D world and interact with the environment. The camera system was designed to integrate with the 3D world of Hyrule, giving the player a sense of perspective and tracking the movements of Link. The game's Z-targeting system was created to provide the player with a simple way to lock on and interact with objects, characters and enemies in the game world. The game also made use of context sensitive controls by using the A button for a range of interactions, such as mounting a horse or opening a treasure chest. These features were landmarks for Nintendo and influenced 3D world development within the games industry.

During development, the staff spent less time on developing the dungeons. According to Miyamoto: "Instead of mapping your way through a maze, I think what's more important is a sense of dread, a sense of pressure, and of course an opportunity for finding secrets and solving puzzles—we should be pursuing an emotional immediacy, the sense that you are really there". Hyrule and its characters in Ocarina of Time were depicted in an art style that drifted towards Western fantasy, although Miyamoto said there was no intentional replication of cultural elements from one specific country. Hyrule's fantasy characters were partially inspired by the American television series Twin Peaks. In an interview, Takashi Tezuka said he had used the series as inspiration when creating Link's Awakening: "After that, in The Legend of Zelda: Ocarina of Time and The Legend of Zelda: Majora's Mask, all kinds of suspicious characters appeared". Many assets and character models in the game were later reused for Majora's Mask, both for stylistic purposes and to save development time.

Open air concept 
Producer Eiji Aonuma approached Breath of the Wild by breaking the conventions of previous games. He explained that in Ocarina of Time, the game world featured "routes" to help players navigate the 3D environment without getting lost, but that certain handholding and blockages had caused players to feel frustrated. By contrast, Breath of the Wild's Hyrule was designed to allow the player to explore a vast world in any way they liked. Nintendo's senior product marketing manager Bill Trinen described the game as "open air": "I look at this game and I see a world that is fully integrated into the exploration and the adventure. It's not just a world that you're passing through. It's sort of a world that you're a part of". The game world benefited from advancements in Nintendo hardware. Earlier games had been restricted by the available technology, creating the need to separate Hyrule into individual connecting areas, but the game world could now be experienced as a seamless environment. The concept of an "open air" environment began during work on The Wind Waker. Aonuma said that he wanted to remove the small connecting areas of The Wind Waker and replace them with open expanses, but the world ended up feeling smaller than he intended. 

{{Quote box
| width = 25em
| align = right
| quote = "In Breath of the Wild, the fact that the world is supported by a coherent physics engine has a major effect on the possible actions. It sounds obvious, but for example, if you push down a rock, it's going to roll according to the slope. We wanted people to be able to feel things in a "realistic" way, to break or move around big objects in the game and believe they could have had the same feeling in real life. This physically lived experience is very important".
| source = Eiji Aonuma on realism in Breath of the Wild'''s game world
}}Breath of the Wilds open world was inspired by other video games. The game's director Hidemaro Fujibayashi named Minecraft and Terraria as his inspirations for "the sense of adventure, exploration and how it inspired curiosity". Aonuma also mentioned several other games that he had played, including The Witcher, Far Cry and The Elder Scrolls V: Skyrim. He also cited Skyward Sword as the basis for many of the world's mechanics, such as the ability to climb and explore between areas. The development team began Breath of the Wild by working on a 2D prototype of Hyrule to test interactions between objects. This was developed into a complex physics and chemistry engine that would present a higher level of realism. The chemistry engine allowed for elements, such as fire, water and electricity to interact with each other and objects in the game world. This was designed to provide the player with a more interactive gameplay that was coined "chemical reaction play". Hyrule in Breath of the Wild was depicted using an art style that was based on the stylised visuals of The Wind Waker but developed into a more realistic, detailed style. The civilization of the Hylians was developed with a focus on their castle in the style of medieval Europe to return to the roots of the series, while the ancient technological features of the Sheikah were inspired by the Jōmon period of Japanese history.

Fujibayashi stated that the layout of Hyrule in Breath of the Wild was inspired in part by his hometown of Kyoto: "I took a map of Kyoto and overlaid it on the game world, and I tried to imagine going to places that I know in Kyoto. I'd think 'It takes this much time to get from point A to point B, so how does that translate to the game?' And that's how we started mapping out the world in Breath of the Wild". The development team used landmarks in Kyoto as a way of comparing the distance between landmarks in the game world, which helped staff during the development of the game. This measurement of distance allowed Hyrule to be scaled up to an enormous world that appears twelve times the size of its predecessor in Twilight Princess. For Tears of the Kingdom, Aonuma confirmed that the game would revisit the same map of Hyrule as the one players experienced in Breath of the Wild: "One of the reasons we wanted to create a continuation was because I wanted to revisit that Hyrule again and use that world again, while incorporating new gameplay and new story".

 Depiction 

The  a medieval-based fantasy land, is the main setting of the series, which first appeared in The Legend of Zelda. Many of its areas have recurring appearances throughout the series, like Hyrule Castle, the Lost Woods, Kakariko Village, Death Mountain and Lake Hylia.

It is established in Ocarina of Time that Din created the physical geography of the realm, Nayru created the physical laws to govern the land, and Farore created the races to uphold the law and the flora and fauna that inhabit the world. Once the goddesses had completed their tasks, they departed for the heavens, and left behind three golden triangles. In these, they put their power to govern all things; this relic became known as the Triforce. The realm itself was eventually named Hyrule after its dominant race, the Hylians, who established a kingdom across the land. The kingdom is ruled by the Royal Family of Hyrule, into which the various incarnations of Princess Zelda are often born.

Hylian is a constructed language that first appears in A Link to the Past, where it is identified as "the ancient language of the Hylians" and is composed of symbols that Link must translate to progress. In Japan, an explanation of the Hylian alphabet was written on the back of the instruction manual for The Wind Waker with a phonographic writing system, or syllabary, like the Japanese language. Since its first appearance, five more Hylian scripts have been developed and deciphered: the Old Hylian Syllabary used in Ocarina of Time, the Modern Hylian Syllabary used in The Wind Waker, the Hylian Alphabet used in Skyward Sword, the Hylian Alphabet used in A Link Between Worlds, and the Hylian Alphabet used in Twilight Princess. The first three are used for transcribing Japanese, while the latter three are used to transcribe English, totalling six variations of written Hylian. Additional languages have subsequently appeared in the series. The language of the Gerudo was introduced in Ocarina of Time, a written and spoken language that is similar to Hylian and is written in elongated, wispy letters. The Sheikah language was introduced in Breath of the Wild and consists of a complete alphabet of square-shaped symbols. Players have deciphered these languages to translate numerous signs and inscriptions commonly found around Hyrule.

The universal currency of Hyrule is the rupee. Although it shares its name with the real-world currency, Miyamoto said in an interview that this was not intentional and that he chose the word because it seemed cute and sounded like "rubies". Rupees resemble hexagonal crystals or gems and come in various colors that determine their value. In the manual for the original game, the currency was called rubies but this was changed to rupees in later games. Subsequent games introduced more colors and sizes for rupees, each denoting a specific value. Generally, green rupees have the least value, while gold and silver rupees have the most.

Hyrulean geography

Hyrulean topography has been revamped with each game in The Legend of Zelda series, resulting in recurring geographical landmarks appearing in locations that vary in relation to each other.
 is a large volcanic mountain located in northern Hyrule. It existed in the original The Legend of Zelda game and has made repeated appearances through the series up to Breath of the Wild. In Twilight Princess it is revealed to be part of a mountain range in the Eldin Province called the Eldin Mountains. The main inhabitants of Death Mountain are the Gorons, a race of rock-eating golems that mine the mountains in search of food and the mountains are littered with caves as a result of the Goron's mining activities.
 is Ganon's fortress, and has acted as the battleground between him and Link in several games. In Ocarina of Time, Link travels to the future and discovers that it has been built in place of Hyrule Castle.
 is the home of Hyrule's royal family. The castle's first appearance was in A Link to the Past, the third game in the series. It is a symbol of the power of the Hyrulean monarchy and is frequently the main target of Hyrule's enemies, particularly Ganon. It is often a central area that Link must enter during his quest.
 is a village that first appears in A Link to the Past and has since reappeared in Ocarina of Time, Four Swords Adventures, Twilight Princess, A Link Between Worlds, and Breath of the Wild. Kakariko Village is often portrayed as a small, prosperous town that was originally founded by the Sheikah. In Twilight Princess, Shadow Beasts have kidnapped most of the villagers, making the town resemble a ghost town. In Breath of the Wild, the village has survived the Great Calamity and is inhabited by the Sheikah.
 is the largest freshwater lake in Hyrule. It commonly features collectible items and one or more dungeons. Link often encounters members of the Zora race at this location.
The  is a large enchanted forest that appears in various titles, starting with The Legend of Zelda. Home to the Kokiri, Koroks and Fairies, its maze-like structure leads travels in circles unless they take the correct path through the forest. Rumors in the game state that those who become lost are turned into Stalfos. In several games, the Great Deku Tree and/or the Master Sword can be found in a shrine there.
 is a location consisting of two large rock formations next to each other that resemble a pair of eyeglasses. It housed the final dungeon in the original game. It is usually associated with Death Mountain, but is located in the Gerudo Highlands in Breath of the Wild. Spectacle Rock also appears in Zelda II: The Adventure of Link, A Link to the Past, and A Link Between Worlds.
 is the temple that houses the Master Sword in several games. The temple is also used to traverse time (most notably in Ocarina of Time), allowing the player to travel between the past and future. In some games, it serves as a dungeon level as well.

 Objects 
 Triforce 

The  also called the "Power of the Gods" and the "Golden Triangle", is a triangular sacred relic left behind by the three Golden Goddesses when they created Hyrule. It is made up of three smaller triangles known as the Triforce of Power, the Triforce of Wisdom, and the Triforce of Courage. These embody the essences of their respective goddesses, and present a power struggle and balance of morality between the central characters, Ganon, Zelda and Link. The Triforce first appeared in the original game as a focal point of the plot, which involves Ganon stealing the Triforce of Power, and Link searching for the scattered pieces of the Triforce of Wisdom to stop Ganon and protect Hyrule from evil. The Triforce of Courage was introduced in The Adventure of Link as the third piece. When united, the Triforce allows one who touches it to make a wish that usually lasts until they die or the wish is fulfilled. If the one who finds it does not possess a balance of the three virtues it represents, the pieces split into its three components and the finder is left with the one that represents the characteristic they value most.

 Master Sword 

The  also known as "The Blade of Evil's Bane", the "Sword of Resurrection", or the "sword that seals the darkness" is a divine, magic sword that is the signature weapon of Link in his quest to save Hyrule. It is one of the few weapons capable of harming Ganon and a key to the Sacred Realm. First introduced in A Link To The Past, it has the power to "repel evil", which enables it to overcome powerful dark magic and slay evil and demonic beings that otherwise cannot be harmed by conventional weaponry. In The Legend of Zelda: Skyward Sword, the blade is revealed to have originally began as the Goddess Sword, which is inhabited by a sentient female spirit named Fi. Near the end of the game, the Goddess Sword transforms into the Master Sword after being infused with Three Sacred Flames, with Fi's spirit form ceasing to be once the Master Sword absorbs the Demon King Demise's remains. The sword traditionally rests in a stone pedestal hidden in sacrosanct locations indigenous to Hyrule, such as the Temple of Time or the Lost Woods. Similar to the Sword in the Stone, the Master Sword can only be removed by someone who is worthy of wielding it.

Other lands and worlds
Hyrule is the main recurring setting of The Legend of Zelda series, but several games are set outside Hyrule in other lands, realms and parallel worlds. The geographical relationship between Hyrule and these other worlds is not clearly defined.

 The Dark World is a parallel world to Hyrule that appears in A Link to the Past. It is a darker version of Hyrule, which is referred to as the Light World.
 The  is the setting of The Wind Waker and Phantom Hourglass, formed after a deluge flooded Hyrule. Only a few mountaintops are still visible above the water, and these form the islands and archipelagos of the Great Sea. Due to the relatively small size of the many islands, the large expanses of ocean between each island require the player to use charts to navigate from island to island.
 Holodrum is a land that Link travels to in Oracle of Seasons. He is found by Din, who is subsequently captured by the General of Darkness, Onox. Din's capture causes the four season in Holodrum to fall into chaos. Holodrum is protected by a huge tree called a Maku Tree. Link eventually dispels the darkness with a Huge Maku Seed.
 Hytopia is a kingdom that is the main setting of Triforce Heroes. The game focuses on the theme of fashion and involves Link attempting to help Princess Styla, who has been cursed to wear a drab jumpsuit.
 Koholint Island is the setting of Link's Awakening. Link is washed ashore on Koholint Island after a terrible storm. A giant egg sits at the top of the island's highest peak. To escape the island, Link must awaken the Wind Fish. He later discovers that waking the Wind Fish will cause the island to disappear as it exists only in the Wind Fish's dreams. Link escapes the island by waking the Wind Fish but, as a result, Koholint Island ceases to exist.
  is a land that appears in Oracle of Ages. In a similar storyline to that of Holodrum, the land of Labrynna is thrown into chaos when Nayru is possessed by a sorceress named Veran, which causes the flow of time to be disrupted.
  is a parallel world to Hyrule in A Link Between Worlds. It is similar to Hyrule in geography and is ruled by Princess Zelda's Lorulean counterpart, Princess Hilda. Like Hyrule, Lorule originally had its own Triforce and was the source of various conflicts. However, the Royal Family of Lorule decided to destroy the Triforce in an attempt to put an end to conflict, only to bring calamity to their world as a result.
 New Hyrule is a kingdom founded by Link and Tetra following the events of Phantom Hourglass, and is seen exclusively in Spirit Tracks. New Hyrule is home to the titular Spirit Tracks, magical train tracks created by the Spirits of Good (the guardian deities of the country) which connect the four sections of the continent and allows for travel by train between them.
  is a collection of large floating islands in Skyward Sword, created when the Goddess Hylia used the last of her power to raise what was left of the surviving Hylians along with a plot of land that was still free during the Great War with Demise. Below the clouds lies "the Surface".
  is a parallel world to Hyrule that serves as the main setting of Majora's Mask. Link falls into this world from a portal deep within the Lost Woods. The land and its citizens are very similar to that of Hyrule. Termina is split into four distinct regions, guarded by four giant deities: the swampy Woodfall, home of the Deku Scrubs, to the south; the icy Snowhead Mountains of the Gorons to the north; Great Bay, home of the Zora to the west; and the undead wastelands of Ikana Canyon to the east. Its capital, Clock Town, lies in the center.
 The Twilight Realm is a parallel world to Hyrule that appears in Twilight Princess. It is a darker, shadowy place that is inhabited by the Twili. In the game, the antagonist Zant overthrows Midna to gain power over the Twilight Realm and transforms the Twili into Shadow Beasts. Link and Midna work together to cleanse the twilight from Hyrule and defeat Zant.
 The World of the Ocean King is the setting of Phantom Hourglass. The game takes place after the events of The Wind Waker and its world is similar to the Great Sea with several islands located on the ocean.

Characters

Races

Since the release of the original game, the series has featured a large number of races within an expanding fictional lore. Alongside the Hylian race that establishes the land of Hyrule, there are various other prominent races, such as the Gorons, Gerudo, Rito and Zora that reappear in several games.

 Ancient Robots are a prehistoric mechanical race that appear in Skyward Sword. Link encounters them in the third area of the game, Lanayru Desert. They were created by the Thunder Dragon Lanayru, but their land eventually became a barren desert while they rusted away. By using a Timeshift Stone to change the present to the past, they can be revived. Although the designers expressed concern about including advanced technology in Skyward Sword, they decided that they did not look out of place with a "softer" design to resemble ancient clay figures from Japanese history, more befitting of fantasy.
 Dragons are a recurring race that usually appear as benevolent guardians or powerful enemies. In Ocarina of Time, Link must slay Volvagia, a dragon boss in the Fire Temple. In The Wind Waker, the Sky Spirit Valoo acts as the godlike dragon and the patron deity of the Rito tribe. When Link arrives on Dragon Roost Island, he defeats a boss named Gohma by damaging Valoo's tail. In Twilight Princess, Link encounters the dragon Argorok, who is the boss of the City in the Sky. In Skyward Sword, Link is aided by three dragons named Faron, Eldin and Lanayru, which guard the three regions of the Surface. In Breath of the Wild, the three dragons   and  can be found in several locations around Hyrule.
 Fairies are magical creatures that appear as small, winged humanoids often obscured by light. Fairies tend to be shy and can be found hiding in many places throughout Hyrule. They are often found at fairy fountains or fairy springs. In most games in the series, fairies will heal Link if he manages to catch one and he can also put them in empty bottles to have them heal him later. If Link dies while he has a bottled fairy in his possession, the fairy will automatically resurrect him. Great fairies are powerful, high ranking fairies that use their magic to enchant Link's items into more powerful versions. In Ocarina of Time, the Kokiri form a symbiotic relationship with their guardian fairies, who act as constant companions and mentors. One of these is Navi, who serves as Link's sidekick and helps him to learn about the world outside Kokiri Forest.
 The  are a race of human warrior-thieves that are indigenous to the harsh Gerudo Desert that bears their name. Gerudo physical traits include scarlet hair, aquiline noses, gold or green eyes, round or pointed ears, and bronzed skin. Like the Amazons, the race consists entirely of women, apart from a single Gerudo male who is born every century. The male is lawfully crowned king of the tribe, and is even worshipped like a God king. When there is no male present to be king, leadership is entrusted to female chiefs. Ganondorf, the main antagonist of the series, is king of the Gerudo. The Gerudo appear as pirates in The Legend of Zelda: Majora's Mask, where they live in the ocean at Great Bay. In The Legend of Zelda: Breath of the Wild, they are traders and merchants. As men are not permitted in Gerudo Town, Link has to crossdress as a female to enter.
 The  are a race of mountain-dwelling rock people who first appeared in Ocarina of Time. They have the ability to roll along the ground and have a round rock-like physical appearance. Goron culture revolves around brotherhood and strength, usually referring to each other and those they deem strong as "Brother" or "Big Brother". Gorons show high regard for individuals who display great strength and bravery and enjoy matching their strength with others in competition such as sumo wrestling and racing. Mainly inhabiting mountainous areas, such as Death Mountain, Gorons are resistant to intense heat and lava and they also consume rocks and minerals, which they mine from the earth.
  are an elf-like race of humans that make up the predominant population of Hyrule, in which they established an organized civilization resembling that of medieval Europe. They were created as the first race of Hyrule by the goddess Hylia, the main fictional deity of the series. They are born with magic-infused blood said to be a gift from the goddesses that grants them psychic powers and magical skill. Their long pointed ears are said to allow them to hear messages sent by the gods. The main characters, Link and Princess Zelda are prominent characters of this race. In Skyward Sword, Hylians live on a floating island named Skyloft and are accompanied by bird-like creatures called loftwings. Hylians are a fairly diverse species, having variations in skin, hair and eye colour. Due to repeated attacks from enemies, such as Ganon, large Hylian armies exist to protect the kingdom of Hyrule.
 The  are a pixie-like race who inhabit the Kokiri Forest. They branched from the Hylians because they wanted to live a more natural life as Hyrule continued to industrialize. They are shielded by the Great Deku Tree who considers them to be his children, and each receives a small fairy that is their lifelong friend, guardian, and teacher. They do not age once they grow up into kids due to the Deku Tree's power. Cautious and secretive, the Kokiri believe that they will die if they leave the forest. Link was raised as a Kokiri in Ocarina of Time, but was not born to them, as his Hylian mother entrusted him to the Great Deku Tree when he was an infant.
 The  are plant-like beings that first appeared in The Wind Waker. They are said to have been transformed from the Kokiri after the Great Flood. They are small creatures with wood-like bodies and masks made from leaves. They are very light, which allows them to travel by using sprouts as propellers. They leave their home, the "Forest Haven", to plant seeds from the Great Deku Tree all over the world, and return once a year to hold a ceremony and obtain more seeds. In Breath of the Wild, Koroks can be found all over Hyrule and their seeds can be traded with Hestu, a large Korok, for weapon inventory slots. Koroks are difficult to find, despite being so numerous and are best protected in Korok Forest, a hidden location in the Lost Woods.
 The  are a race of birds with long necks and human-like faces that appear in Twilight Princess. A female Oocca named  can warp the player back to the entrance of the game's dungeons. Ooccoo's son,  warps the player to Ooccoo's location. In Twilight Princess, these creatures are mentioned to be closer to the gods than the Hylians. Some in Hyrule theorise that the Oocca actually evolved into the Hylians. It is supposed that they created Hylians and created a city in the sky for them to live in. In Twilight Princess, Link reaches this city by launching himself out of an enormous cannon. Ooccoo has also appeared in other Nintendo games, such as Super Smash Bros. Brawl and Hyrule Warriors.
They are only visible to children and tend to live in forests, but also appear inside of buildings and holes in and around various spots of Hyrule. There are three variations of the Minish, which can be distinguished by their attire: Forest Minish, Town Minish and Mountain Minish. They first appear in The Minish Cap. Most Minish are helpful, and like to hide valuable objects for others to find, although one Picori,  became evil after becoming obsessed with human nature.
 The  are a race of raptor-like humanoids who debuted in The Wind Waker. They evolved from the Zora species. In that game, they lived on Dragon Roost Island, an island on the Great Sea. They have a tribal elder and elaborately dressed guards. In The Wind Waker, Rito are born without wings, and instead, must visit their guardian, the Sky Spirit, Valoo, in a coming-of-age ceremony to receive one of his scales, which enables them to grow wings. Throughout a young Rito's childhood, he or she is called a Fledgling and is flightless without any wings. After a child reaches a certain age they can receive their wings after they retrieve a scale from the dragon Valoo. Most Rito can fly over a great distance and hover in place, but some have trouble flying for long periods of time. In Breath of the Wild, the Rito reside in the Hebra region in northwest Hyrule and tolerate cold climates. These Rito feature a much more prominent avian design that includes wings and are able to fly using updrafts. Prominent Rito characters include Revali, the Rito Champion, and Kass, a wandering minstrel who displays the Rito's appreciation of music through song.
 The  are ancient and mysterious ninja-like warriors who are commonly distinguished by their red eyes and white hair. The most prominent recurring representative of the Sheikah is Zelda's nursemaid and bodyguard Impa. They bear a physical resemblance to Hylians, but are a completely different race, having great technological prowess. Physically they are extremely capable, able to run and jump better than other Hyruleans. They are also some of the most potent magic-wielders in Hyrule. The Sheikah have a divinely ordained role to protect the Hyrule Royal Family. Their symbol, the Eye of the Sheikah, which is depicted as a single eye with three triangles above and a teardrop beneath, is commonly seen in the series, even in games where the Sheikah are not present. In Breath of the Wild, examples of the advanced technology created by the Sheikah can be found in the hidden structures around Hyrule and in the form of Link's Sheikah Slate.
  are a race that exist in the Twilight Realm and appear in Twilight Princess. The Twili come from a group referred to as the Interlopers, who used extraordinary magic to dominate a war between Hylians for the Triforce and the Sacred Realm. Seeing this, the Golden Goddesses ordered the Light Spirits to seal their magic in the Fused Shadow; the Interlopers were then banished to the Twilight Realm, a dark mirror world of Hyrule, where they adapted and evolved into the Twili. He overthrew Midna with Ganondorf's help in order to become king of the Twilight.
 The  are a race of aquatic piscine humanoids that inhabit Zora's Domain or Lake Hylia. In the original game and Link to the Past, Zora were enemies that attacked Link from the water with projectiles, though the giant Zora King sells Link a pair of flippers in A Link to the Past, allowing him to swim and to use the network of whirlpools that link far corners of Hyrule. By Ocarina of Time, their role in most stories had changed to a neutral or friendly race. Zora government is monarchical, either ruled by a king, with examples being King Dorephan or King Zora De Bon XVI, or queen, such as Queen Oren or Queen . Two different branches exist: "River Zora" are more violent and can shoot fire, while "Sea Zora" are generally passive. Zora have extraordinarily long lifespans and lay eggs to reproduce. Zora eggs need to be kept in cold, clean water to develop healthily, and every egg from the same clutch must be kept together for them to hatch. Newborn Zora have the appearance of a tadpole.

 Enemies 

The appearance of some creatures varies across different titles of the series:

  are animated statues built to guard ancient ruins that come to life and attack when disturbed. They have monstrous appearances and carry a sword and shield. If Link approaches, they will chase after him. They first appeared in The Legend of Zelda.
  are a race of goblin-like creatures, that first appeared in The Wind Waker. Bokoblins come in a variety of colors. They often appear as standard enemies and wield boko sticks, machetes and clubs. Though their appearance varies from game to game, the one thing that remains consistent is they wear loincloths with a single skull. In Twilight Princess, they are less common and their role as standard enemies is largely taken over by the Bulblins. In Skyward Sword, Bokoblins are common monsters that serve the Demon Tribe, under Demon Lord Ghirahim and the Demon King Demise. The game also introduces Technoblins and Cursed Bokoblins, undead Bokoblins that can curse Link. In Breath of the Wild, Bokoblins are low-level, comical enemies that commonly appear across Hyrule living in camps.
  are jelly-like creatures with squat, translucent bodies, stalk-eyes, and a smiling mouth. They mostly move by bouncing around. ChuChus appear in various colours and some possess specific abilities. Once they are defeated, they will drop ChuChu jelly, which can be used by Link as an ingredient and for upgrading armour.
  are large armored knights armed with swords and shields. They first appeared in The Legend of Zelda but are recurring foes that appear in Twilight Princess and other games.
  are wooden plant-like creatures introduced in Ocarina of Time that appear mostly in the overworld and dungeons. Deku are small creatures that have leaves sprouting out from their heads, red glowing eyes and tube-like mouths that can shoot Deku Nuts. They can fly by using large leaves to glide, and some can use the leaves on their head to fly indefinitely after taking off from a Deku Flower. There are four types of Deku depicted in the series: Deku Scrubs, Mad Scrubs, Business Scrubs, and Royal Scrubs.
  and Wallmasters are ghostly manifestations of giant hands that drag adventurers back to the entrance of a dungeon. Floormasters split up into smaller versions when the original is attacked. Wallmasters first appeared in The Legend of Zelda while Floormasters first appeared in Ocarina of Time. Floormasters also appear in The Wind Waker and The Minish Cap.
  are undead creatures wrapped like mummies. They resemble ReDeads in regards to their slow and zombie-like movement; in some games, setting a Gibdo's bandages alight will reveal a Stalfos or a ReDead underneath. They first appeared in The Legend of Zelda.
  are recurring boss monsters which typically resemble giant arthropods with a single eye. The eye serves as their weak point. The original Gohma first appeared in The Legend of Zelda game.
 Guardians are large mechanical foes that can blast enemies with a powerful laser from their single eye. They appear in Breath of the Wild. Guardian Stalkers roam Hyrule by moving on their mechanical legs, whilst Guardian Skywatchers use propellers for locomotion. Producer Eiji Aonuma said that they were based on the octoroks that appear in the original game.
  are a recurring enemy and sub-boss in the Legend of Zelda series. The Hinox's single eye is its most vulnerable place, dealing the most damage to it when hit. They are cyclops-like ogres and have appeared in A Link to the Past, Link's Awakening, Four Swords Adventures, Phantom Hourglass, A Link Between Worlds, Tri Force Heroes and most recently, Breath of the Wild. In Breath of the Wild, Hinoxs can be either red, blue or black, depending on their strength. They are the largest monster found within the game and will uproot nearby trees to use as weapons against the player if provoked. Stalnox are skeletal versions of Hinox that appear in Breath of the Wild.
  are bat monsters that often lurk in dark places such as caves, waiting to dive bomb unwary travelers attempting to bite off chunks of flesh. Some Keese have the ability to pick up elements they fly through and there are fire, ice, cursed, and electric variants. They first appeared in The Legend of Zelda.
  are yellowish cylindrical monsters that can suck in creatures as large as humans and consume items they carry. They are known for swallowing the shields and tunics that Link uses. Like Likes dissolve into a puddle when killed, leaving the stolen items. They first appeared in The Legend of Zelda.
 : are swift and cunning anthropomorphic lizards that often attack in pairs and can parry and dodge oncoming attacks. They first appeared in The Adventure of Link. In Breath of the Wild, Lizalfos can throw weapons and dash toward their target.
  are large, strong centaur-like creatures with a head of a lion and horns that first appeared in The Legend of Zelda. This creature has multiple variations including red, blue, white, and silver, with each color denoting the Lynel's strength. In Breath of the Wild, Lynels are extremely powerful foes that are resistant to attacks.
  are orc-like monsters that serve as Ganon's footsoldiers. In The Legend of Zelda and The Adventure of Link, Moblins resembled bulldogs, but are pig-like in more recent games. They commonly wield spears, swords, bows, or occasionally massive clubs. They are one of the most common enemies in the games and are considered "mighty", but also "dumb".The Minish Cap, Swiftblade: "Those pig-faced Moblins...You see them around the Minish Woods, right? They're big and dumb? Well, they're also rich!" They are described as greedy, self-possessed creatures, and the major antagonist will commonly use them as mercenaries or summoned monsters.
  are octopus monsters that have appeared in almost every Legend of Zelda game (except for Twilight Princess). Octoroks produce rocks within their body that they can fire from their snout via compressed air with the force of a musket shot. Some species of Octorok are land-dwelling while others are mostly aquatic. Big Octos are a very large ocean-dwelling breed sometimes known to attack ships. They first appeared in The Legend of Zelda.
  are lantern-carrying ghosts formed from concentrated hatred toward the living that freely roam graveyards and other haunted locales. They always carry their signature lanterns. In some editions, they can go invisible when Link is doing a certain action or in a certain form. They first appeared in The Legend of Zelda.
  are undead creatures resembling zombies with dark brown skin and flat mask-like faces that can paralyze enemies with a scream, and cling to them to drain health away. They first appeared in Ocarina of Time.
  are giant spiders, named for the bony plate in the shape of a human skull that forms their carapace. They are most commonly found in dark places, such as forests, caves, and dungeons but can also sometimes be found in towns at night. Skulltulas and Giant Skulltulas hang from ceiling surfaces, suspended by a strand of silk waiting to drop on unwary prey.
  are animated skeletons mostly from the remains of dead warriors who still have a strong will to fight, and serve evil powers such as Ganon or Vaati. In Ocarina of Time, by using the Mask of Truth, the player learns from a Gossip Stone that humans that get lost while in the Lost Woods will become Stalfos. They first appeared in The Legend of Zelda.
  are cyclopean four-legged insectoid creatures who use their powerful legs to leap upon and attack prey. Blue Tektites can walk on water, and both Blue and Red Tektites can jump up cliffs. They first appeared in The Legend of Zelda.
  are magician-like creatures that wear wizard robes and often use fire and ice magic. They first appeared in The Legend of Zelda. Breath of the Wild introduced elemental Wizzrobes, who use various magical rods to summon elemental attacks, elemental enemies and even change the weather accordingly. The regular types are the Fire, Electric and Ice Wizzrobes, however each has a more powerful variant. These are known as Meteo and Thunder Wizzrobes, and Blizzrobes respectively.

Reception
In their January 2010 issue, Nintendo Power listed Hyrule as one of the greatest Nintendo locations, citing the vast number of areas to explore, as well as referencing players' first experiences with the Lost Woods and Death Mountain as highlights of the players' adventures. Steve Watts of GameSpot praised the original game world, commenting that although it is minimalist, it, "conveys the feeling of going on a grand adventure through the wilderness, and the lack of hand-holding that would come to define later Zelda games makes the world feel that much more expansive and mysterious". Yannick LeJacq writing for Kotaku commented that "Hyrule is one of the most iconic settings in the history of video games. The Legend of Zelda players have been poring over it in one way or another for almost 30 years now".

Polygon's Jeremy Parish remarked on the impact that Hyrule and its centrepiece Hyrule Field had on gamers in Ocarina of Time. He commented: "Open game worlds existed before Ocarina of Time. And in truth, Ocarina’s rendition of Hyrule isn't even really all that open. But the game explored the relationship between its environments, the camera's 3D perspective and Link's place in it all to create a realm that felt far more like a real location than the game worlds that had come before it". Destructoid also noted Hyrule's impact in Ocarina of Time, saying "there was nothing else like it before 1998" and continued: "The awesome thing about Hyrule is that I can honestly see a place like it existing in our world. It's not just some fantasy, flashy place like you'd find in the Star Wars universe. It's meant to look like the real world, and Miyamoto achieved that goal in a way no one would have expected without actually seeing it first".

The open world of Hyrule in Breath of the Wild has received praise for its design. Noelle Warner of Destructoid ranked all of the settlements in Breath of the Wild and chose Tarrey Town as the favourite location, because players must build it from the ground up, making it one of the longest side quests in the game. Kate Gray writing for The Guardian was impressed by the beauty and large scale of the game world, noting that "the greens of the open plains contrast with the dark black of Death Mountain, which is streaked with orange lava on the distant horizon". She also commented on the "range of quiet, clever techniques designed to help players navigate the environment". Andrew Webster of The Verge responded positively to the grandness of the game's massive open world: "The scale could have been daunting, but the joy of discovery and the satisfaction that comes from finding your own way make it inviting instead".

Senior editor Caty McCarthy of USgamer ranked the in-game map of A Link to the Past as the best video game map, describing it as "perfect" world design in terms of the way it integrates with the gameplay. IGN ranked Hyrule as the sixth greatest game world, commenting, "few game worlds manage to leave as indelible an impression on the collective gaming subconscious as Zelda has. For that alone it ranks up there as one of the best, most fully realized worlds in all of gaming". In 2021, Evan Narcisse of Kotaku listed Hyrule as one of the richest sci-fi and fantasy worlds in video games.

 Influence and legacy 
Since the release of the original The Legend of Zelda game, critics have commented on the influence and legacy of The Legend of Zelda universe on the gaming industry. Ozzie Mejia of Shacknews highlighted the importance of the original The Legend of Zelda: "Before the open worlds of a World of Warcraft, a Grand Theft Auto, or a Skyrim, there was the intimidating land of Hyrule. The Legend of Zelda has done more than shape the series as it's known today. It is known for influencing many of today's best games and its formula has inspired many of today's most recognizable game developers, both in the mainstream and indie space". Liz Finnegan for The Escapist commented on the original game's influence on the RPG genre, particularly its nonlinear open world, and opined, "Zelda's design inspired countless other titles to adopt the action-adventure-exploration hybrid with a top-down perspective and expansive, cohesive overworld. These games have long since been informally dubbed "Zelda clones". Christian Donlan of Eurogamer noted the similarity and influence that Hyrule had on Dark Souls, comparing both kingdoms: "In the original Legend of Zelda, however, Hyrule feels, well, a bit more like Lordran - a place of scarred earth and wasteland, parched and rugged and filled with horrible creatures that erupt from the sands or move in staggering hops". The original game was a phenomenal commercial success for Nintendo, selling over 6.5 million copies, and has been described by many critics as one of the greatest video games of all time.

USGamer'''s Nadia Oxford commented on the significance of Ocarina of Time and considered it to be "a genius work of game design". She stated: "It brought the traditionally top-down series into a fully 3D realm while successfully preserving the heart and soul of previous Zelda games. Its "Z-targeting" mechanic refined the clumsy auto-targeting systems that made 3D console games of the day feel inferior to 3D action games on the PC. Finally, it presented a story about healing a broken world". Heather Alexandra writing for Kotaku remarked on the impact of the game's release: "There have been countless open world games since 1998, but Ocarina of Time was the moment when the concept of massive, interconnected worlds began to really crystalize". Keza MacDonald of The Guardian also commented on the influence of Ocarina of Time, noting that it was one of the first real 3D adventures and that it "remains eminently playable today because so many of the things it invented became standard for any 3D game that came after it". Tom Power of Gamesradar opined that the game is often considered to be the greatest video game due to its technological innovations: "The problems Nintendo solved back then have been influential across gaming genres and, whilst public acknowledgment of this influence is thin on the ground, it's difficult not to view Ocarina of Time as one of the fathers of modern gaming".

In the months following the release of Breath of the Wild in 2017, many video game developers were influenced by its open world design. Alx Preston, creator of Hyper Light Drifter remarked that "the sense of freedom and experimentation is incredibly inspiring". Adam Saltsman, creator of Canabalt commented on the consistency of the game environment and the player's ability to experiment. Vlambeer's Rami Ismail said that "no game has done verticality as well as BotW". Sam Byford writing for The Verge commented on the impact of Breath of the Wilds open world on the video game industry, describing it as a "revolutionary approach to open-world game design". He cited several other subsequent game worlds that bear similarities to Breath of the Wild, including Genshin Impact, Immortals Fenyx Rising and Horizon Forbidden West. Both the miHoYo development team of Genshin Impact and Sam Barlow, creator of Telling Lies have cited Breath of the Wild as a significant source of inspiration. Elden Ring director Hidetaka Miyazaki also said that he was influenced by Breath of the Wild's open world. Upon its release, Breath of the Wild achieved critical acclaim and was the biggest commercial success of the franchise and one of the best-selling video games, selling nearly 23 million copies on the Nintendo Switch and over 1.6 million copies on the Wii U.

Notes

References

Fantasy worlds
Fictional countries in other worlds
The Legend of Zelda
Video game locations
The Legend of Zelda characters
Fantasy creatures
Legend of Zelda
Legend of Zelda
Fictional elements introduced in 1986